The 514th Operations Group is a United States Air Force Reserve unit, assigned to the 514th Air Mobility Wing.  It is stationed at Joint Base McGuire-Dix-Lakehurst, New Jersey.

The first predecessor of the group was the 4th Combat Cargo Group, which served in the China-Burma-India Theater during World War II

Its second predecessor was first activated in the reserve in 1947 as the 514th Troop Carrier Group  The group was called to active dute for the Korean War and served in the United States as a training unit for Curtiss C-46 Commando Aircraft.  After the war, it returned to the reserve, serving until 1959, when it was inactivated as the reserves reorganized under the dual deputy concept.  The group was again activated in 1992 under the United States Air Force's Objective Wing reorganization.  The two groups were consolidated in 2001.

Overview
The group is the flying component of the 514th Air Mobility Wing.  The group flies aircraft assigned to the active-duty 305th Air Mobility Wing, also based at McGuire. The 514th shares the responsibility of maintaining and flying the McDonnell Douglas KC-10A Extender and the Boeing C-17 Globemaster III.

Units
 76th Air Refueling Squadron (KC-10 Extender)
 78th Air Refueling Squadron (KC-10 Extender)
 732d Airlift Squadron (C-17 Globemaster III)
 514th Aeromedical Evacuation Squadron
 514th Operations Support Flight
 514th Air Mobility Operations Squadron

History
The 514th trained in the U.S. with Curtiss C-46 Commando and Douglas C-47 Skytrain aircraft before moving to India in November 1944, beginning operations in early December as part of the combined Combat Cargo Task Force.  It transported reinforcements and supplies for Allied forces in Burma until May 1945.  Operations included moving equipment and materials for the Ledo Road in December 1944; transporting men, mules, and boats when the Allies crossed the Ayeyarwady River in February 1945; and dropping Gurkha paratroops during the assault on Rangoon in May.  The group moved to Burma in June and hauled ammunition, gasoline, mules, and men to China until the war ended.

The group trained in the Reserve for troop carrier operations, May 1947 until the establishment of the wing in 1949 and from then until February 1953 first at Birmingham Municipal Airport, Alabama under supervision of the 2587th Air Force Reserve Training Center but moved without personnel or equipment to Mitchel Air Force Base, New York during its first year.  The wing was ordered to active duty in May 1951.  From then until February 1953, the wing performed troop carrier missions in tactical exercises and joint training operations.  It operated a C-46 Commando combat crew training school from 15 September 1952 to 20 January 1953.

Activated in the Reserve in Aug 1992 to fly strategic airlift missions. Provided trained personnel to augment active force in emergencies. Personnel assigned to its squadrons participated in contingency airlift operations, some to Africa, and in training exercises. The group also began flying air refueling missions in 1994.

Lineage
 344th Military Airlift Group
 Established as the 4th Combat Cargo Group on 9 June 1944
 Activated on 13 June 1944
 Inactivated on 9 February 1946
 Disestablished on 8 October 1948
 Reestablished and redesignated 344th Military Airlift Group on 31 July 1985
 Consolidated with the 514th Troop Carrier Group as the 514th Troop Carrier Group on 26 January 2001

 514th Operations Group
 Established as the 514th Troop Carrier Group on 13 May 1947
 Activated in the reserve on 29 May 1947
 Redesignated 514th Troop Carrier Group, Medium on 26 June 1949
 Ordered to active service on 1 May 1951
 Inactivated on 1 February 1953
 Activated in the reserve on 1 April 1953
 Inactivated on 14 April 1959
 Redesignated 514th Military Airlift Group on 31 July 1985 (remained inactive)
 Redesignated 514th Operations Group on 1 August 1992 and activated in the reserve
 Consolidated with the 344th Military Airlift Group on 26 January 2001

Assignments
 I Troop Carrier Command, 13 June 1944
 Army Air Forces, India-Burma Theater, November 1944 (attached to Combat Cargo Task Force, c. 29 November 1944 – 31 May 1945, India-China Division, Air Transport Command, 15 June–13 October 1945)
 Eastern India Air Depot, 15 January-9 February 1946
 302d Troop Carrier Wing (later 302d Air Division), 29 May 1947
 514th Troop Carrier Wing, 26 June 1949 – 1 February 1953
 514th Troop Carrier Wing, 1 April 1953 – 14 April 1959
 514th Airlift Wing (later 514th Air Mobility Wing), 1 August 1992 – present

Components
 World War II
 13th Combat Cargo Squadron: 13 June 1944 – 29 December 1945
 14th Combat Cargo Squadron: 13 June 1944 – 9 February 1946
 15th Combat Cargo Squadron: 13 June 1944 – 29 December 1945
 16th Combat Cargo Squadron: 13 June 1944 – 5 September 1945; 21 October–29 December 1945
 348th Airdrome Squadron: November 1944 – c. 5 September 1945
 349th Airdrome Squadron: November 1944 – c. 5 September 1945 
 350th Airdrome Squadron: November 1944 – c. 5 September 1945
 351st Airdrome Squadron: November 1944 – c. 5 September 1945

 Reserves
 76th Air Refueling Squadron: 1 October 1994 – present
 78th Air Refueling Squadron: 1 October 1994 – present
 323d Troop Carrier Squadron: 30 September 1947 – 27 June 1949
 324th Troop Carrier Squadron: 17 July 1947 – 27 June 1949
 325th Troop Carrier Squadron: 15 July 1947 – 27 June 1949
 327th Troop Carrier Squadron: 29 May 1947 – 2 September 1949
 335th Troop Carrier Squadron (later 335th Airlift Squadron): 26 June 1949 – 1 February 1953; 1 April 1953 – 14 April 1959; 1 August 1992 – 30 September 1995
 336th Troop Carrier Squadron: 26 June 1949 – 1 February 1953; 1 April 1953 – 14 April 1959
 337th Troop Carrier Squadron: 26 June 1949 – 1 February 1953; 1 April 1953 – 1 July 1957; 8 July 1958 – 14 April 1959
 338th Troop Carrier Squadron: 26 June 1949 – 2 May 1951
 514th Operations Support Squadron (later 514th Operations Support Flight, 514th Operations Support Squadron): 1 August 1992 – present 
 702d Airlift Squadron: 1 August 1992 – 1 March 2000
 732d Airlift Squadron, 1 August 1992 – present

Stations

 Syracuse Army Air Base, New York, 13 June 1944
 Bowman Field, Kentucky, 17 August 1944
 Baer Field, Indiana, 6–16 November 1944
 Sylhet Airfield, India, c. 28 November 1944
 Agartala Airfield, India, late December 1944
 Chittagong Airfield, India, 31 January 1945
 Namponmao Airfield, Burma, 10 June 1945

 Ondal Airfield, India, November 1945 –9 Feb 1946
 Marietta Army Air Field (later Marietta Air Force Base), Georgia, 29 May 1947
 Birmingham Municipal Airport, Alabama, 26 June 1949
 Mitchel Air Force Base, New York, 10 October 1949 – 1 February 1953
 Mitchel Air Force Base, New York, 1 April 1953 – 14 April 1959
 McGuire Air Force Base (later Joint Base McGuire-Dix-Lakehurst), New Jersey, 1 August 1992 – present

Aircraft
 Douglas C-47 Skytrain, 1944
 Curtiss C-46 Commando, 1944–1945; 1949–1951; 1953–1954
 Fairchild C-119 Flying Boxcar, 1952–1953; 1954–1959
 Lockheed C-141 Starlifter, 1992–1999
 Boeing C-17 Globemaster III, 1999–present
 McDonnell Douglas KC-10 Extender, 1994–present
 Boeing KC-46A Pegasus, Nov 2021-present

References 

 Notes

 Citations

Bibliography

 
 
 
 

Military units and formations established in 1943